Global Defence Force Tactics, known in Japan as  is a PlayStation 2 turn-based strategy game developed by thinkArts.

Gameplay
Players assume the role of GDF Commander and control GDF units in turn-based missions against the giant bug menace. Missions take place on 2D hex-maps, with attacks depicted by brief animated cutscenes.

The game has 50 stages and 250 different weapons.

Reception
Reception for the game was negative.  In Japan, Famitsu gave it a score of one three, one five, one six, and one five for a total of 19 out of 40.

See also
 Simple series video games

Notes

References

2006 video games
D3 Publisher games
Earth Defense Force
PlayStation 2 games
PlayStation 2-only games
Single-player video games
Turn-based strategy video games
Video game spin-offs
Video games developed in Japan